Andreas Wormdahl (20 January 1911  –  14 June 2001) was a Norwegian politician for the Labour Party.

He was born in Trondheim.

He was elected to the Norwegian Parliament from Sør-Trøndelag in 1958, and was re-elected on two occasions.

Wormdahl was a member of Orkanger municipality council in the periods 1934–1937 and 1937–1940.

References

1911 births
2001 deaths
Labour Party (Norway) politicians
Members of the Storting
20th-century Norwegian politicians
Politicians from Trondheim